Laurent Chambertin (born September 29, 1966 in Dijon, Côte-d'Or) is a retired volleyball player from France, who earned a total number of 336 caps for the Men's National Team. He also competed in the men's tournament at the 1992 Summer Olympics.

International Competitions
1989 – European Championship (5th place)
1990 – World League (5th place)
1990 – World Championship (8th place)
1991 – World League (8th place)
1991 – European Championship (9th place)
1992 – World League (11th place)
1992 – Summer Olympics (9th place)
1993 – European Championship (9th place)
1997 – European Championship (4th place)
1999 – World League (7th place)
1999 – European Championship (6th place)
2000 – World League (7th place)
2001 – World League (6th place)
2001 – European Championship (7th place)

References

External links
 L'Equipe Profile

1966 births
Living people
Sportspeople from Dijon
French men's volleyball players
Volleyball players at the 1992 Summer Olympics
Olympic volleyball players of France